Captain Thomas Henry Duthie (6 June 1806 - 13 October 1857) was a Scottish member of the 72nd Highlanders who arrived in Cape Town, South Africa in 1826 and was stationed at the Castle of Good Hope.

Duthie married Caroline Rex, the daughter of the founder of Knysna, George Rex.
He was the owner of the Belvidere, Brenton and Portland estates, the last sold to Henry Barrington. He was the founder of the Holy Trinity Church of Belvidere; he laid the foundation stone in 1851 and the church was consecrated in 1855. The Duthies hosted many a traveller and scientist of note at Belvidere House, like the German Christian Ferdinand Friedrich Krauss. Captain Duthie was also appointed Inspector of Crown Forest and lands.

References 

 
 

1806 births
1857 deaths
72nd Highlanders officers
Alumni of the University of St Andrews
People from Knysna
Scottish emigrants to South Africa